Skjernøy is an island in Lindesnes municipality in Agder county, Norway. The  island is the southernmost inhabited island in Norway. The island of Skjernøy is connected to the mainland by the Skjernøysund Bridge. The island has about 400 residents, a school, and a chapel.

References

Islands of Agder
Lindesnes